Gunnar Alf Erik Berggren (26 January 1908 – 2 September 1983) was a Swedish boxer who won bronze medals in the lightweight division at the 1927 European Championships and 1928 Summer Olympics. After the Olympics he turned professional and had a record of 13 wins, 9 losses and 10 draws, before retiring in 1936. He competed for Hammarby IF throughout his whole career.

1928 Olympic results
Below is the record of Gunnar Berggren, a Swedish lightweight boxer who competed at the 1928 Amsterdam Olympics:

 Round of 32: defeated Pierre Godart (Belgium) on points
 Round of 16: defeated Robert Smith (South Africa) on points
 Quarterfinal: defeated Jorge Diaz (Chile) on points
 Semifinal: lost to Stephen Halaiko (United States) on points
 Bronze Medal Bout: defeated Hans Jacob Nielsen (Denmark) on points (was awarded bronze medal)

References

External links

1908 births
1983 deaths
Lightweight boxers
Olympic boxers of Sweden
Boxers at the 1928 Summer Olympics
Olympic bronze medalists for Sweden
Olympic medalists in boxing
Swedish male boxers
Medalists at the 1928 Summer Olympics
20th-century Swedish people